Tonight I'm Yours is the eleventh studio album by Rod Stewart released in 1981. It features hints of classic rock, pop and new wave. The album had three hit singles, with the title track "Tonight I'm Yours (Don't Hurt Me)" (US Billboard No. 20, US Cash Box No. 15; Canada No. 2), "Young Turks" (US No. 5), and  "How Long" (US No. 49).

Album information
Tonight I'm Yours saw Rod Stewart further adopting current musical trends, after some disco-influenced songs on Blondes Have More Fun and Foolish Behaviour, by adding elements of synth-pop and new wave to a couple of songs (the title track, and "Young Turks"), while mostly keeping to his rock traditions elsewhere. The album included three covers: "Tear It Up", "How Long", and "Just Like a Woman".

The song "Never Give Up on a Dream" was dedicated to Canadian athlete Terry Fox, who ran 3,339 miles with one prosthetic leg in the Marathon of Hope to raise money for cancer research. Fox succumbed to cancer in 1981, the year the album was released.

The music video for "Tonight I'm Yours" was shot by Australian film director, Russell Mulcahy.

Critical reception
The album was mostly well received, being given four out of five stars in both Rolling Stone's contemporary review and in a retrospective from AllMusic. On AllMusic, Stewart has not yet surpassed the 4-star rating that the album received with any of his subsequent releases. The album has sold more than 10 million copies worldwide.

Track listing

Personnel
Adapted from Discogs.

Rod Stewart – vocals
Jim Cregan – guitar (all tracks), backing vocals
Robin Le Mesurier – guitar (all tracks except "Tonight I'm Yours", "Jealous" and "Young Turks")
Jeff Baxter – guitar on "Tonight I'm Yours," pedal steel guitar on "Just Like a Woman"
Danny Johnson – guitar on "Jealous"
Byron Berline – fiddle on "Only a Boy"
Jimmy Zavala – harmonica, saxophone
Kevin Savigar – keyboards
Duane Hitchings – keyboards ("Tonight I'm Yours" and "Young Turks")
Jay Davis – bass guitar
Carmine Appice – drums ("Tonight I'm Yours" and "Young Turks"), backing vocals
Tony Brock – drums (all tracks except "Tonight I'm Yours" and "Young Turks," on which he played percussion), tambourine on "Never Give Up on a Dream," backing vocals
Paulinho da Costa – percussion
Tommy Vig – tubular bells
Penny Jones – soloist on "Never Give Up on a Dream"
Linda Lewis, The Pentecostal Community Choir – backing vocals
Karat Faye – engineer

Charts

Weekly charts

Year-end charts

Certifications

References

1981 albums
Riva Records albums
Rod Stewart albums
Warner Records albums